The first seeds Esna Boyd and Meryl O'Hara Wood defeated second-seeded Daphne Akhurst and Marjorie Cox 6–3, 6–8, 8–6 in the final, to win the women's doubles tennis title at the 1926 Australasian Championships.

Seeds

  Esna Boyd /  Meryl O'Hara Wood (champions)
  Daphne Akhurst /  Marjorie Cox (final)
  Sylvia Harper /  Minnie Richardson (semifinals)
  Kathleen Le Messurier /  Dorothy Weston (semifinals)

Draw

Draw

Notes

 Most likely Flora Rowe, mother of Ernest Rowe.
 Most likely. Often spelled Miss C. Finlayson, even in sources that mentioned her as Miss M. Finlayson in other articles.

References

External links
 Source for seedings

1926 in Australian tennis
1926 in women's tennis
1926 in Australian women's sport